William Harrison Peppers (September 1866 – November 5, 1903) was a pitcher in Major League Baseball. He played for the Louisville Colonels in 1894.

References

External links

1866 births
1903 deaths
Major League Baseball pitchers
Louisville Colonels players
Baseball players from Kentucky
19th-century baseball players
Webb City Stars players
Webb City (minor league baseball) players
Houston Mudcats players
Montgomery Colts players
Indianapolis Hoosiers (minor league) players
Savannah Modocs players
St. Paul Apostles players
Dallas Steers players